Charles Gordon Ames (3 October 1828, Dorchester, Massachusetts - 15 April 1912) was a United States Unitarian clergyman, editor and lecturer.

Biography
He was a foundling, adopted by his parents when he was three years old. Ames spent his early years on a farm and in a printing-office in New Hampshire. He graduated from the Geauga Seminary of Ohio, and was ordained in 1849 as a Free Will Baptist, and became the founding minister for a church of that sect in Minneapolis in 1851. He was secretary of the founding meeting of the Minnesota branch of the Republican Party in 1854, and from 1855 to 1857 edited the Minnesota Republican, the first Republican paper in the Northwest. He found his congregation wanting in the faith and attitude he expected, and after five years he left the Minneapolis church, and, for a time, the ministry.

He settled in Boston in 1859, became a Unitarian, and later succeeded James Freeman Clarke as pastor of the Church of the Disciples there. He edited the Christian Register of Boston from 1877 to 1880. In 1881, he was elected as a member to the American Philosophical Society. In 1889 Ames succeeded the Rev. James Freeman Clarke as pastor of the Church of the Disciples (Boston). In 1896 he received the degree of D.D. from Bates College.

In 1863, he married activist Fanny Baker Ames. This was his second marriage: in 1850 he had married Sarah Jane Daniels.

Publications
  (with J. Peter Lesley)
 George Eliot's Two Marriages (1886)
 As Natural as Life (1894)
 Poems (1898)
 Sermons of Sunrise (1901)
 Five Points of Faith (1903)

Notes

References

External links
 
A collection of sermons written by Charles Gordon Ames and collected by Ellen M. Shumway are in the Harvard Divinity School Library at Harvard Divinity School in Cambridge, Massachusetts.
Letters to Clara Bancroft Beatley from Charles Gordon Ames are in the Harvard Divinity School Library at Harvard Divinity School in Cambridge, Massachusetts.
Papers of Charles Gordon Ames form part of the Ames family historical collection, Schlesinger Library, Radcliffe Institute, Harvard University.

1828 births
1912 deaths
American Unitarian clergy
American editors